"Representin" is a song by American hip hop recording artist Ludacris, featuring vocals from American singer-songwriter Kelly Rowland. It was released October 9, 2012 in promotion of his ninth studio album, Ludaversal. It is a hip hop and R&B song. The song debuted and peaked at number 97 on the Billboard Hot 100 while reaching number 28 on the Hot R&B/Hip-Hop Songs. The official remix features the R&B singer R. Kelly and the American rapper Fabolous.

Music video
A music video to accompany the release of "Representin" was first released onto YouTube on 29 October 2012 at a total length of four minutes and thirteen seconds.

Track listing

Remix

Chart performance

Release history

References

2012 singles
Ludacris songs
Def Jam Recordings singles
Songs written by Ludacris
Kelly Rowland songs
Songs written by Jim Jonsin
Songs written by Rico Love
Song recordings produced by Jim Jonsin
Song recordings produced by Rico Love
2012 songs